Schizothorax lantsangensis is a species of ray-finned fish in the genus Schizothorax which is endemic to the upper Mekong River basin in Yunnan.

References 

Schizothorax
Fish described in 1964